Sebastian Owuya (born 8 October 1991) is a Swedish former professional ice hockey player, who played in briefly in the Swedish Hockey League (Eliteserien) with Timrå IK and later with Kongsvinger Knights of the Norwegian GET-ligaen. He predominately played in the Swedish third tier, the HockeyEttan.

Playing career
Owuya played one season of major junior hockey in North America with the Medicine Hat Tigers of the Western Hockey League (WHL). Owuya was drafted in the sixth-round, 169th overall, by the Atlanta Thrashers in the 2010 NHL Entry Draft. Sebastian's brother Mark is a goaltender who played for the Toronto Marlies. The brothers were born to a Ugandan father and a Russian mother.

Career statistics

References

External links

1991 births
Atlanta Thrashers draft picks
Borås HC players
Kongsvinger Knights players
Living people
Medicine Hat Tigers players
Swedish ice hockey defencemen
Black ice hockey players
Swedish people of Russian descent
Stockton Thunder players
IF Sundsvall Hockey players
Timrå IK players
Swedish people of Ugandan descent
Ice hockey people from Stockholm